The Technology Alliance is a Washington state organization of leaders from high-tech businesses, research institutions, and the community dedicated to Washington's economic success.

Programs

Research 
The Alliance developed a set of research studies benchmarking technology-based economic development and higher education as well as creating policy recommendations for state initiatives.

Alliance of Angels 
The Technology Alliance administers a membership organization called the Alliance of Angels to encourage angel and venture capital investment in Northwest technology startups.

Ada Developers Academy 

In September 2013, Technology Alliance helped to launch Ada Developers Academy, a year-long intensive school in software development for women.

External links 
 Technology Alliance

Non-profit organizations based in Seattle